Newcastle rugby league team may refer to the following rugby league teams from:

Newcastle, New South Wales:
Newcastle rugby league team, a representative team made up of players from Newcastle Rugby League clubs.
Newcastle Knights, a club established in 1988 that competes in the National Rugby League
Newcastle Rebels, a club established in 1908 that competed in Sydney's NSWRFL Premiership
Newcastle upon Tyne:
Newcastle Storm, a club established in 2010 that competes in the Rugby League Conference North East Division
Newcastle RLFC, a club established in 1938 that competed in the Rugby Football League Championship